This is a list of unmade and unreleased projects by DC Comics. Some of these productions were, or still are, in "development hell" in other mediums.

Batman

Fleischer Studios' Batman
Following the success of the Fleischer Superman cartoons, Fleischer Studios communicated with DC Comics over the possibility of adapting Batman. The communication got to the point of budget discussions as illustrated in a letter dated January 25, 1942, and reproduced in longtime Batman executive producer, Michael E. Uslan's 2011 memoir, The Boy Who Loved Batman. It is, however, unknown how far the production of this project went before being abandoned.

CBS' Mike Henry Batman
Prior to the 1966 juggernaut that was the Adam West/Burt Ward Batman series, CBS attempted to launch a live action children's program based on the character. Former Rams linebacker and Tarzan actor Mike Henry was soon approached to appear as the character and even took publicity stills. The project went into limbo, and after a long stagnation, producers attempted to ironically sell it to NBC; they passed on the project in 1965.

Batman vs. Godzilla
The original idea for this seemingly mismatched crossover comes from the hand of series writer Shinichi Sekizawa, who submitted a manuscript of the proposal in November 1965. Sekizawa's concept featured several characters from the Batman universe, including Robin and Commissioner Gordon. To actually battle the King of the Monsters, Batman and his sidekicks would have utilized several vehicles to engage in combat, including the Batmobile, the Batcopter, and the Batcycle. Interesting to note, the concept also featured the introduction of a weather control apparatus, an idea which would later be worked into the script for Son of Godzilla (1967). It was also going to have another device to control Godzilla himself, which would possibly indicate another antagonist pitting the two characters against each other.
In terms of Sekizawa's motivation, his reasoning seems clear in these drafts: to try and repeat the mammoth international success that the crossover film King Kong vs. Godzilla (1962) enjoyed. This is made apparent in allusions to the earlier 1962 film, as even this extremely early take at the concept included mention of Godzilla's battle with King Kong, which was noted as being included with stock footage of the two titans fighting.
Not surprisingly, though, the concept never got far enough for a full-fledged script to have been created. There are many questions related to the proposal still unknown as well, such as if DC Comics was ever actually approached with the idea or not. It is also not known to what degree the then-recent Batman TV series, which debuted two months after Sekizawa proposed this idea, might have played, if any. It is also interesting to note that references to "Batgirl" are made in the concept, which would predate the Barbara Gordon version of the character that would later become synonymous with the name in 1966.

Tim Burton Batman Continues
During the early development of the cancelled Catwoman spin-off, Burton expressed his interest in directing the third installment of the Batman film series that began with Batman in 1989. The Monkees lead drummer Micky Dolenz was attached to star as the Riddler, the film's main antagonist. Also, Harvey Dent's transformation into Two-Face was supposed to occur in the film, with Billy Dee Williams reprising his role as Dent from the first film, after turning down the offer to appear in Batman Returns. Along with these, Michelle Pfeiffer was attached to return as Catwoman, Marlon Wayans was attached to star as Robin, and Rene Russo was attached to star as Dr. Chase Meridian. However, when Warner Bros. observed that the script was just as gloomy as the previous film, they decided to put Joel Schumacher as the director of the third installment, leading to the release of Batman Forever, in which Burton served as producer, without being able to contribute ideas.

Joel Schumacher's Batman Unchained

Batman: Year One live action film

Batman: Assault on Arkham 2
In a 2016 interview, Jay Oliva mentioned that he had plans to make a sequel to Batman: Assault on Arkham, but following his departure from Warner Bros. Animation, the project was pulled off.

Batman: The Musical
In 2002, Burton, Jim Steinman, and David Ives had worked on a theater production called Batman: The Musical. Steinman has revealed five songs from the musical. The first is the opening theme for "Gotham City" and the entry of Batman with his tortured solo "The Graveyard Shift"; followed by "The Joker's Song (Where Does He Get All Those Wonderful Toys?)", "The Catwoman's Song (I Need All The Love I Can Get)", "We're Still the Children We Once Were" (the climactic sequence) and "In the Land of the Pig, the Butcher is King", sung by the corrupt bloodsuckers ruling Gotham; the last song mentioned here was covered on the Meat Loaf album Bat Out of Hell III: The Monster Is Loose. After production was cancelled, these songs were released on the Batman: The Musical memorial site.

Bruce Wayne

Gotham High
An animated series that reimagines Batman characters as high school students was in development in the late 2000s and early 2010s. A similar idea was used for the DC Super Hero Girls 2015 shorts and the 2019 animated series.

Batman: No Man's Land

Batman: Arkham
After the success of Batman & Mr. Freeze: Subzero, Warner Bros. greenlighted the production of a third installment, entitled Batman: Arkham. Boyd Kirkland, the director of this film, was attached to write and direct. The film would have Batman and Robin facing off against a collection of Arkham Asylum escapees, in addition to Batman finding himself falling in love with a new love interest, planned to be voiced by Angie Harmon. The main cast of Batman: The Animated Series was attached to reprise their roles. Steven E. Gordon also drew some art concept for the film. The film was ultimately cancelled in favor of Batman Beyond: Return of the Joker (which also featured Harmon), while Batman: Arkham eventually became a successful video game series by Rocksteady.

The Batman vs. Hush
A second movie of The Batman titled The Batman vs. Hush that featured Hush as the main villain along with the Joker, the Penguin, the Riddler, Catwoman and Clayface was planned for a long time. The film ended up being scrapped. Before its cancellation, producer Alan Burnett had hopes of making one or two more DTV movies based on The Batman. A similar film based on Batman: Hush ultimately came out in 2019 as part of the DC Animated Movie Universe.

Batman Beyond

Batman Beyond live action film

Untitled Batman Beyond: Return of the Joker sequel
A second Batman Beyond film was planned for release, but was finally scrapped due to the dark tones and controversies of Batman Beyond: Return of the Joker in 2001.

Untitled Batman Beyond animated film
Timm has mentioned that a Batman Beyond film is a possibility, and in August 2017, Tucker stated in his Twitter account that discussions about a possible Batman Beyond film occur several times at the studio.

In the Batman Family

Batgirl
A spin-off of the 1966 Batman show was noted in 1967 but did not go past a seven-minute presentation.

Robin
A spin-off to Batman and Robin based on Robin was in the works, but was cancelled due to the critical and box office failure of the 1997 film.

Batgirl: Year One
Batman: Year One'''s executive producer Bruce Timm and co-director Lauren Montgomery expressed interest in producing an animated film based on Batgirl: Year One, but DC cancelled all plans for an adaptation.

Nightwing: The Animated Series
An animated series featuring Nightwing was in development from Ki Hyun Ryu of The Boondocks and The Legend of Korra fame. The series was rejected in favor for Young Justice.

Catwoman: The Animated Series
In the massive success of Batman: The Animated Series, Fox Kids approached Bruce Timm on making a spin-off based on Catwoman. The series was scrapped in favor of Superman: The Animated Series.

Tim Burton's Catwoman spin-offBatman Returns would be the last film in the Warner Bros. Batman film series that featured Burton and Michael Keaton as director and leading actor. With Batman Forever, Warner Bros. decided to go in a "lighter" direction to be more mainstream in the process of a family film. Burton had no interest in returning to direct a sequel, but was credited as producer. With Warner Bros. moving on development for Batman Forever in June 1993, a Catwoman spin-off was announced. Michelle Pfeiffer was to reprise her role, with the character not to appear in Forever because of her own spin-off.

Burton became attached as director, while producer Denise Di Novi and writer Daniel Waters also returned. In January 1994, Burton was unsure of his plans to direct Catwoman or an adaptation of "The Fall of the House of Usher". On June 6, 1995, Waters turned in his Catwoman script to Warner Bros., the same day Batman Forever was released. Burton was still being courted to direct. Waters joked: "Turning it in the day Batman Forever opened may not have been my best logistical move, in that it's the celebration of the fun-for-the-whole-family Batman. Catwoman is definitely not a fun-for-the-whole-family script". In an August 1995 interview, Pfeiffer reiterated her interest in the spin-off, but explained her priorities would be challenged as a mother and commitments to other projects. The film labored in development hell for years, with Pfeiffer replaced by Ashley Judd. The film ended up becoming the critically panned Catwoman (2004), starring Halle Berry.

Untitled direct-to-video Catwoman film
Around 2003, during the production of Batman: Mystery of the Batwoman, Warner Bros. approached Boyd Kirkland to write a Catwoman direct-to-video feature film as a tie-in with the 2004 live-action film. Although the script was written, the project was soon scrapped after the poor reception of the live-action film.

Direct-to-video Joker film
In 2016, Batman: The Killing Joke screenwriter Brian Azzarello had stated that he would like to adapt his novel Joker into an animated film.

The Joker vs. the Powerpuff Girls
During the initial run of the Cartoon Network series The Powerpuff Girls, series creator Craig McCracken wanted to do a crossover episode featuring the Joker. On Tumblr, he said:

Superman
Superman III: Supergirl
Producer Ilya Salkind originally wrote a treatment for the third installment from the Superman film series starring Christopher Reeve that expanded the film's scope to a cosmic scale, introducing the villains Brainiac and Mister Mxyzptlk, as well as Supergirl. The original outline featured a father–daughter relationship between Brainiac and Supergirl and a romance between Superman and Supergirl, even though the two are cousins in the comics. Warner Bros. rejected the outline and made their own Superman III film.

Superman V
A sequel to the original Superman film series was in the works following Superman IV: The Quest for Peace. The film was cancelled due to the fact that Quest for Peace was a flop.

Superman Reborn

Superman Lives

Superman: Flyby

Superman Returns sequel

 Untitled Man of Steel sequel 

 Untitled Superman spin-off series 
In June 2006, during an interview about Superman: Brainiac Attacks, writer Duane Capizzi mentioned a Superman series set in the same universe of The Batman, a possibility supported by Superman's revealed existence during the show's fifth season. Despite this, the expansion was never realized, and Capizzi never again mentioned the spin-off.

Superman: Red Son live action film
In 2017, Jordan Vogt-Roberts pitched a Red Son adaptation to Warner Brothers, as an "offshoot" of the DC Extended Universe with different actors for Superman and Batman, but "was told no". Mark Millar responded by saying that two friends of his had been approached by WB to direct a live-action Red Son. An animated film ultimately came out in 2020 as part of the DC Universe Animated Original Movies.

In the Superman Family
The Adventures of Superboy TV pilot

The Adventures of Superpup TV pilot

Metropolis TV series
In January 2018, Gotham producers John Stephens and Danny Cannon and Warner Bros. Television were reportedly given a 13-episode straight-to-series order for the DC Universe series Metropolis, which follows Lois Lane and Lex Luthor as they investigate the world of fringe science and expose the city's dark and bizarre secrets. Later in May, the series was being redeveloped, but no further news came of project's status.

Untitled Superman Family animated series
In May 2018, Vinton Heuck and Sean Galloway pitched an idea for a Superman Family animated series to Warner Bros. Animation but the pitch was rejected in favor of Harley Quinn animated series.

Wonder Woman
 Who's Afraid of Diana Prince TV pilot (1967) 
A proposed 1967 television series, that only resulted in the production of a short pilot. The success of the Batman television series led Batman producer William Dozier to commission a pilot script by Stan Hart and Larry Siegel. Batman writer Stanley Ralph Ross was then asked to perform a re-write, after Hart and Siegel's script was deemed unsuitable. A portion of the pilot, under five minutes in length, was filmed by Greenway Productions, the company behind the Batman show under the title Who's Afraid of Diana Prince? The piece starred Ellie Wood Walker (Robert Walker Jr.'s wife) as Diana Prince, Linda Harrison as Diana's Wonder Woman alter ego and Maudie Prickett as Diana's mother. In the proposed series Diana Prince (not Wonder Woman) would have been the focus of the comedy. Diana, an awkward and rather plain young woman, lives with her mother close to a United States Air Force base. Much of the film consists of her mother berating Diana about not having a boyfriend. When her mother leaves the room, Diana changes into her Wonder Woman costume and admires her reflection in a mirror. What she sees is not Diana Prince, but rather a sexy super-heroic figure (played by Linda Harrison) who proceeds to preen and pose as the song "Oh, You Beautiful Doll" plays on the soundtrack. The pilot ends with Diana climbing out a window and flying away, indicating that, despite her apparent delusions regarding her alter ego, she does have some super powers. This pilot episode was never broadcast and the project was abandoned.

Filmation's Wonder Woman animated series
Animation studio Filmation considered making an animated series based on Wonder Woman in 1968 following the then-massive success of the TV series Batman, but nothing came out of it.

 1999 NBC series Lois & Clark: The New Adventures of Superman producer Deborah Joy LeVine attempted to do a Wonder Woman TV series in 1999 for NBC. The character was stated to be, "a Greek history professor, a young and very bright woman having a hard time juggling her personal life with her work".

Early attempts of a Wonder Woman film

Wonder Woman 2 (2011)

There were plans to make a sequel to the 2009 direct-to-video film Wonder Woman, but was cancelled due to poor DVD sales.

 Wonder Woman TV pilot (2011) 

A TV series based on Wonder Woman was in the works in 2010 that would have aired on NBC in 2011.

The CW's Amazon
In 2012, The CW, Warner Bros. Television and DC Comics announced that they were developing a new origin story for Wonder Woman called Amazon. In early 2013, the network pushed the pilot back until the 2014/15 season. The same year in May, The CW announced that the show was still in development, with a new script by Aron Eli Coleite, replacing Allan Heinberg, who wrote the previous script for the planned pilot, but in July The Flash, by Greg Berlanti and Andrew Kreisberg was fast-tracked instead. Mark Pedowitz confirmed that "Amazon is on pause (as) the script is not exactly what we wanted, and with an iconic character like Wonder Woman, we have to get it right". The project was canceled in early 2014, as Pedowitz confirmed to The Hollywood Reporter: "We did not go forward with it [...] it all depends on the script. We were very careful with Arrow, and we're being very careful with Flash [...] these are iconic characters, so we're going to be very careful with Wonder Woman. You only get one shot before you get bit". Pedowitz later said in August 2017 that the success of the feature film has killed any current attempts to bring the Amazonian warrior to the small screen on their channel.

Justice League
Justice League of America (1990)
In 1990, Magnum Pictures developed a script for a Justice League TV show starring Booster Gold, Blue Beetle, Fire and Ice plus other members from the comic's Justice League International run.

George Miller's Justice League: Mortal

Justice League of America

Early attempt at a Justice League series
An early attempt at a Justice League television series was to feature lesser known superheroes, like the Question and Doctor Fate, that would have been part of the DC Animated Universe. The series was cancelled in favor of Batman Beyond.

Justice League: Worlds Collide
Circa 2004, Bruce Timm announced that a direct-to-video Justice League feature film was in the works. The film was intended to make a bridge between the second season of Justice League to the first season of Justice League Unlimited. The film was planned to reveal how Wonder Woman acquired her Invisible-Jet, and also planned to feature the Crime Syndicate as the main antagonists, an idea that was originally conceived for the two-part episode "A Better World", until the Syndicate was replaced by the Justice Lords. Dwayne McDuffie wrote the script and Andrea Romano assembled the cast, but Warner Bros. finally scrapped the project. In 2010, the film's plot was used for the non-DCAU film Justice League: Crisis on Two Earths, but removing all references to the continuity of the DC animated universe, and replacing John Stewart with Hal Jordan as the Justice League's Green Lantern.

JLA/Avengers film

In 2009, Bruce Timm has expressed interest in an animated film based on the JLA/Avengers crossover limited series. As of 2020, no updates have appeared since.

Crisis on Infinite Earths film
In 2009, Bruce Timm mentioned the possibility of an animated film of Crisis on Infinite Earths.

Untitled direct-to-video Justice League film
An untitled Justice League direct to DVD film was in the works in 2008, with a design by James Tucker.

 Untitled Justice League sequels 

A sequels to Justice League (2017) were in development, with Zack Snyder attached to direct. By 2019, Warner Bros. had prioritized standalone films over the project.

Superman and Batman
 Untitled Batman/Superman TV series 
There were plans to make an animated series featuring Superman and Batman. It would have been an origin story.

 Batman vs. Superman 

Teen Titans
 Hanna Barbera's Teen Titans 
In the 1980s, Hanna Barbera planned a TV series for the Teen Titans in the same universe as the Super Friends.

 DCAU's Teen Titans TV series 
An early plan for the Teen Titans TV series was to include it into the DC Animated Universe. This idea was later abandoned in favor of being its own stand-alone series. This roster would have included Robin, Kid Flash, Wonder Girl, Speedy, Aqualad, the Flash, and Aquaman.

 Teen Titans live action film 

Around the time of the cancellation of Teen Titans (2003–06), WB was thinking of a live action film version of the Teen Titans with different looks, but later on it got scrapped and left behind a well-hidden Easter egg in 2007's I Am Legend, where Will Smith's character enters a local video store and in the background is a 2009 Teen Titans movie poster saying that the film is coming soon to DVD. This was turned into Teen Titans: Trouble in Tokyo.

Blackbirds
In September 2014, TNT announced a live-action Teen Titans television series originally titled Titans before Blackbirds. In November, Akiva Goldsman and Marc Haimes wrote the script for the pilot. Filming was scheduled to begin mid-2015 but was postponed to October. The project was ultimately cancelled in January 2016. The roster would have included Nightwing, Starfire, Raven, Hawk and Dove and Oracle.

The Flash
Early attempts at a The Flash live action film (2000s)

The WB's Flash
In 2003, The WB was planning a Flash TV series with Todd Komarnicki signed on to write and executive produce it. Inspired by the 1960s science fiction drama The Time Tunnel, the series would have been a loose adaptation of the Flash, depicting him as a fresh-out-of-college Gotham City resident who uses his powers to travel backwards and forwards in time, going on missions. As with Smallville, the series would have eschewed superhero costumes altogether.

Plastic Man
Early attempts of a live action Plastic Man film
A live action feature film featuring Plastic Man was in the works in 1992. It would have been produced by Amblin Entertainment, Warner Bros., and DreamWorks SKG, written by The Wachowskis, and to be directed by Brian Spicer, following the success of 1989's Batman. Nothing was made official until 14 years later, following the box-office disaster of The Wachowskis' Speed Racer, they decided to resurrect the old script and make the film with a release date set for December 2009. Both Jim Carrey and Bruce Campbell were considered for the role, until Keanu Reeves was announced to play Plastic Man. Nothing came out of this proposed 2009 film either. In 2013, rumors began to spread that David Tennant would play Plastic Man in the 2017 Justice League film as a comical character, something that The Flash's role in the film is. Later in December 2018, a new development of a Plastic Man film was announced as part of DC Extended Universe, with Amanda Idoko instead writing the screenplay and Robert Shaye executive producing. Cat Vasko was later hired to do rewrite of her screenplay, now reworked as a female-centered film.

Plastic Man animated film
Filmmaker and comic book writer Kevin Smith mentioned at Calgary Comic and Entertainment Expo that he met with Geoff Johns and pitched an animated Plastic Man film that he wrote for DC. There have been no further developments since.

Plastic Man TV series
Several attempts to make a TV series based on Plastic Man were in development, one being in 1967 at Hal Seeger Productions, and another at Filmation.

Another attempt was in the 2006 where Warner Bros. Animation and Cartoon Network commissioned an animated pilot titled "Puddle Trouble". They ultimately decided not to pick it up as a series, but the pilot can be seen on the Plastic Man: The Complete Collection DVD set.

Aquaman
Aquaman TV pilot (2006)

Aquaman animated film
An animated film based on Aquaman was first mentioned by Bruce Timm in 2010, but was cancelled due to marketing concerns. Filmmaker Adam Green even wrote a screenplay to Aquaman.

Early attempts of an Aquaman live action film
In 2003, Sunrise Entertainment made plans to produce an Aquaman film with Warner Bros., with first time writer Ben Grant set to write the screenplay. Nothing came out of this. Until a year, Leonardo DiCaprio signed on to the project that would have been produced by his production company, Appian Way Productions, but nothing came out of this either.

Green Lantern
Early attempts of a Green Lantern live action film

Green Lantern: First Flight sequel
There were plans to make a sequel to Green Lantern: First Flight; nothing came of it due to poor DVD sales.

Green Lantern (2011) sequels

Sinestro Corps War animated film
DC's executive editor Dan DiDio has expressed interest in seeing the 2007–2008 Sinestro Corps War comic storyline adapted.

Green Arrow
In 1990, according to TV Guide magazine at the time, Green Arrow live action series was in development but nothing came of it.

Green Arrow: Escape from Super Max

Untitled Green Arrow animated film
Bruce Timm has said that he would like to do a Green Arrow film.

 Cyborg 

Cyborg TV series
A planned Cyborg series was in development with Drake as the character.

 Cyborg film 

A solo Cyborg film in the DC Extended Universe was announced in October 2014, with Ray Fisher set to reprise his role from the then upcoming Batman v Superman: Dawn of Justice. Joe Morton was also set to reprise his role as Silas Stone. Though the film was consistently stated to be in production until 2020, by 2021, amidst a dispute between Ray Fisher and Warner Bros. Pictures regarding an investigation in the reshoot process on Justice League, he stated that he would not play the role in any film that has then President of DC Films Walter Hamada's involvement. DC Films responded by stating that they will not recast the role.

Deadman
Deadman film
Guillermo del Toro has taken interest in producing a film based on Deadman, supposedly from the only source. Variety reported that Nikolaj Arcel was set to direct the film. Since then, no updates have emerged for the project.

Deadman TV series
Following the success of X-Men in 2000, Warner Bros. Television announced that a Deadman television film for TNT was in development, which was also being considered as a pilot for a potential television series. The project was still in development by 2003, but was later shelved. In 2011, WBTV hired Supernatural creator Eric Kripke to helm a Deadman television series for The CW, as the network was looking to commission a new superhero series. The following year, another superhero series debuted on the network. A Deadman series never materialized and Kripke has since moved on to other projects.

Rōnin
 Rōnin film 
In 1998, Darren Aronofsky signed a deal with New Line Cinema for a film adaptation of the graphic novel Rōnin.
In 2007, Gianni Nunnari, producer of 300, announced he would be producing and Sylvain White, director of Stomp the Yard, directing the Rōnin film adaptation. No further news came after its announcement.

Rōnin TV miniseries
In April 2014, the Syfy channel revealed that they are adapting Rōnin into a miniseries. No further news came after its announcement.

Watchmen
Early development of Watchmen live action film

Watchmen animated direct-to-video film
Warner Bros. announced in April 2017 to develop an R-rated animated film based on the comic book.

Static
Static Shock TV series
In October 2014, Warner Bros. intended to launch a live-action Static Shock program from Reginald Hudlin as part of the company's new Blue Ribbon Content digital division, and were eyeing Jaden Smith for the role of Virgil Hawkins/Static. Actor Tyler James Williams said in May 2015 interview that Jaden Smith was cast as Static, but this has yet to be confirmed by Blue Ribbon Content or by Warner Bros. Hudlin, DC Comics Chief Creative Officer Geoff Johns, and Denys Cowan are collaborating on the live-action project. Since then, there have been no new announcements.

 Static animated direct-to-video film 
In August 2017, when asked on his Twitter account if the character could have a feature film set in the DC animated universe as part of the DC Universe Animated Original Movies, producer James Tucker responded that there is interest in Static on the studio. There have been no further discussions for such a project.

Lobo
Lobo: The Animated Series
Following his appearance on Superman: The Animated Series, plans for a children's television show based on the character Lobo was in development at Kids WB. Due to executive issues, the series was converted into an adult-oriented Flash animated web series that was released in 2000.

Lobo TV series spin-off
Syfy announced a Lobo spin-off series from season 2 of Krypton in June 2019, with Krypton executive producer Cameron Welsh serving as executive producer/writer. Two months later, Syfy cancelled the Lobo spin-off along with Krypton.

Lobo & Crush
Olan Rogers pitched an adult animated series based on Lobo and his daughter Crush to WB in 2020 before it was scrapped year later in September.

Others
Booster Gold
In 2011, Syfy revealed that were developing a live action Booster Gold series. Two years later, a pilot script was turned in but nothing came of it.

Unlimited Powers
In 1989, Danny Bilson and Paul Renal worked on a live-action series starring The Flash, Dr. Occult, Book from the "Legion of Superheroes" and the daughter of Green Arrow. It didn't make it past the script phase.

Early development of Zatanna film
In 2005, Ice Princess screenwriter Hadley Davis was hired to write an action-comedy film about a teenage version of Zatanna. Warner Bros later put Zatanna solo film as part of the DC Extended Universe.

Deathbed TV series
In January 2021, TNT was set to develop a television series adaptation of Joshua Williamson and Riley Rossmo's Vertigo Comics limited series Deathbed, with Neil Reynolds writing the series and Julie Plec to executive produce via My So-Called Company along with Warner Bros. Television. There have been no further announcements since.

Blue Beetle TV series
Geoff Johns announced a live action TV series featuring the Jamie Reyes version of Blue Beetle. They made a test trailer with stuntman and actor Garrett Plotkin as Jaime Reyes. Scenes of this trailer were shown as part of the upcoming DC Nation block of programming in 2012 on Cartoon Network during the premiere of Green Lantern: The Animated Series. Since then, nothing has been announced about the project.

Swamp Thing reboot
In 2009, Joel Silver announced plans to produce a reboot of Wes Craven Swamp Thing film from a story written by Akiva Goldsman. In April 2010, Vincenzo Natali was confirmed to direct, but on May 12, Vincenzo Natali decided to delay the Swamp Thing reboot to pursue other projects. Since then, nothing has been said about the project.

Metal Men film
A film adaptation of Metal Men entered development in 2007. Later in June 2012, Barry Sonnenfeld was in talks to direct the film. The project was in limbo until October 2021 when it was listed as part of DC Extended Universe.

Hourman TV series
In November 2013, a live-action Hourman series was revealed to be in development at The CW. Michael Caleo was writing the script, to executive produce the series alongside Dan Lin, and Jennifer Gwartz. The premise of the series "centers on a brilliant-yet-troubled pharmaceutical analyst who discovers that the visions that have plagued him since childhood are actually glimpses of tragic events occurring one hour in the future. Determined to win back his ex-wife and son, he heroically prevents these tragedies from unfolding, finding both purpose and redemption along the way". Since then, no progress on the series was made after its announcement.

Spectre TV series
Fox announced in 2011 plans to develop a television series featuring the Spectre. There have been no further developments since.

#4Hero web series
Machinima Inc. and DC Entertainment were producing a live-action web series based on an updated version of Dial H for Hero. Titled #4Hero, the VFX-heavy comedy would have been about a young woman named Nellie Tribble who discovers a smartphone app that allows her to temporarily gain semi-useful superpowers dictated by whatever is trending at the moment. Since then, no production updates were announced.

The original Human Target TV series
The original version of Human Target was created by Warner Bros. Television and Pet Fly Productions, producers of The Flash and later  The Sentinel for Paramount Pictures. The original pilot for the series was filmed in 1990 but ABC declined to pick up the series for the 1990-91 television season and this pilot never aired. In the original unaired pilot, musician Clarence Clemons who was trying to establish himself as an actor, played Chance's pilot.

Harvey Shephard, then the president of Warner Bros. Television, told The New York Times in December 1991 that Human Target was intended for both American audiences and the international television market. A different pilot was filmed, resulting in the 1992 short-lived TV series Human Target.

Jonah Hex TV special
In 2000, 20th Century Fox developed a one-hour adaptation based on the character Jonah Hex to television with producers Akiva Goldsman and Robert Zappia involved, but the project never made it into production.

Starman television series
There was a television series planned based on Jack Knight adventures from the creators of Smallville and Birds of Prey. It would have featured both Jack and his father, been set in Opal City, and attempted to follow the comics as closely as possible. However, in 2003, after the failure of Birds of Prey, it was last referred to as being "indefinitely on hold". There has since been no sign that it will ever be produced.

Early attempts at a Mad TV series
A 1974 animated television pilot based on the Mad magazine that used selected material from the magazine was commissioned by ABC, but the network decided to not broadcast it. Dick DeBartolo noted that "nobody wanted to sponsor a show that made fun of products that were advertised on TV, like car manufacturers". The program was instead created into a TV special and is available for online viewing.

In the mid-1980s, Hanna-Barbera developed another potential Mad animated television series which was never broadcast.

Sgt. Rock film
In the late 1980s and early 1990s, Arnold Schwarzenegger was attached to the title role of a Sgt. Rock film, despite the seeming incongruity of an Austrian actor playing an American G.I. in World War II. Screenplays were written by David Webb Peoples in 1987, Steven E. de Souza in 1988, John Milius in 1993, and Brian Helgeland in 1996, depicting Rock as having a German-American father and being able to speak German (a skill he uses to ambush the enemy). Producer Joel Silver still attempted to make a Sgt. Rock movie. John Cox has written the latest screenplay, which is not based on any of the previous screenplay drafts. Cox has stated that Schwarzenegger is no longer attached to star in the project. In April 2007, David Gambino, VP at Silver Pictures said: "The good news is we have a fantastic screenplay and everybody's really happy with it. It's really just about trying to attach cast right now and really decide what the movie is going to be, how we're going to make it". Bruce Willis was reportedly under consideration for the role. In December 2008, Guy Ritchie reported that the film has been shelved due to his work on Sherlock Holmes but confirmed that the Sgt. Rock film will indeed be set during World War II and include the members of Easy Company. Silver later announced in February 2010 that the setting was changed from World War II to another battle in the near future. Since then, there have been no further announcements.

New Gods animated film
Writer J. M. DeMatteis was interested in scripting a New Gods film set in the DC Animated Movie Universe.

Project 13 TV series
In October 2017, The CW was developing a one-hour drama series based on Traci Thirteen and her father Dr. Terrance Thirteen, titled Project 13, with Elizabeth Banks attached as an executive producer.

Secret Six TV series
In October 2018, Suits’s Rick Muirragui was to write and produce a Secret Six TV series with Bill Lawrence's Doozer Productions for CBS.

Early attempts of a Shazam! film

Monolith film
Lionsgate announced in August 2016 that an adaptation of Monolith was in development with visual effects director Dave Wilson as director.

The Mighty film
In June 2011, Paramount Pictures acquired the rights to The Mighty''. There have been no further developments since.

Kamandi TV series
In the late 1970s, an animated Kamandi television series was optioned, but was cancelled before entering the production phase.

Doom Patrol film
In 2006, Warner Bros. hired Adam Turner to pen a Doom Patrol screenplay. No director, cast, or release date has been announced.

See also
 List of unproduced Marvel Comics projects
 List of unproduced Dark Horse Comics projects
 List of unproduced Image Comics projects
 List of unproduced films based on DC Comics imprints

References

Works based on DC Comics
DC Comics
Unproduced projects
Sequential lists of films based on comics, arranged in chronological order
Superhero films
DC Comics
Unproduced DC Comics projects